Bergkamen (Westphalian: Biärgkoamen) is a town in the district of Unna, in North Rhine-Westphalia, Germany.

Bergkamen, a fairly new town in the east part of the Ruhr Area and south of the Münsterland, was founded in 1966 by the merging of at first five smaller communities. The town‘s history, however, reaches back to ancient Roman times - this can be experienced by visiting the Bergkamen Municipal Museum, which has a large Roman department, and the nearby archeological site, the “Roemerlager“.

Main sights
Westphalian Sports Boat Centre - Marina Ruenthe
The neighbouring national trust area, “Beversee“, and the wooded hill, “Grosses Holz“, a renaturalized former slag heap, provide an inviting atmosphere for relaxation.

Cultural events
Harbour Festival ("Hafenfest") in June
Light Festival ("Lichtermarkt") in October.

Bergkamen is home to  theatre performances at the “studio theater bergkamen“ and numerous exhibitions in the town‘s own art gallery “sohle1“ or the “Stadtmuseum“

History 

In February 1946, a coal mine in the city suffered a dust explosion that killed 418 miners. This was the worst mining accident in German history.

Twin towns – sister cities

Bergkamen is twinned with:
 Hettstedt, Germany (1990)
 Silifke, Turkey (1994)
 Gennevilliers, France (1995)
 Wieliczka, Poland (1995)

Notable people 

 Ernst von Bodelschwingh-Velmede (1794–1854), Prussian Minister of Interior and Cabinet
 Carl von Bodelschwingh (1800–1873), Prussian Finance Minister
 Ernst von Bodelschwingh (1906–1993), politician (Member of Bundestag, CDU)
 Hans Sennholz (1922–2007), economist
 Dietrich Schwanitz (1940–2004), best-selling author, grew up in Rünthe
 Eugen Drewermann (born 1940), theologian, church critic, best-seller author
 Peer Steinbrück (born 1947), politician (SPD), Member of Landtag, for Bergkamen 2000–2005
 Konrad Ott (born 1959), philosopher and ethicist
 Heiko Antoniewicz (born 1965), cook
 Frauke Petry (born 1975), politician (AfD), lived in Bergkamen and went to school there

See also
TuRa Bergkamen

References

External links

  
 Website of Roland Schäfer, the former mayor of Bergkamen

Unna (district)